Brightwell Castle was in the village of Brightwell-cum-Sotwell, between the towns of Didcot and Wallingford, now in Oxfordshire but until 1974 in Berkshire, in England.

The castle was built in 1145 by King Stephen.  At the time there was civil war known as The Anarchy between King Stephen and his cousin Empress Matilda, whose headquarters were at nearby Wallingford Castle.  In 1153 the castle was destroyed by Matilda's son, who later became Henry II.

A manor house now stands on the site.

References
Brightwell Castle
Fry, Plantagenet Somerset, The David & Charles Book of Castles, David & Charles, 1980. 

Castles in Berkshire
South Oxfordshire District